The United States has published multiple lists of the habeas corpus petitions filed on behalf of detainees apprehended in the course of its War on Terror.
It was the position of the Bush Presidency that none of these detainees were entitled to have writs of habeas corpus considered by the US Justice system.
But some jurists differed.
And several habeas corpus cases have been considered by the United States Supreme Court, or are scheduled to be considered by the Supreme Court.



Habeas petitions for detainees who have been repatriated
The Bush Presidency argued that Guantanamo detainees
who have been repatriated from Guantanamo should have their cases dismissed as moot.
The determination that these detainees were "enemy combatants" remain in effect.

See also
Guantanamo Bay attorneys
Guantanamo military commissions
OARDEC

References

External links

United States habeas corpus case law